The Knights of the Cross with the Red Star or Military Order of the Crusaders of the Red Star is a religious Order originating from Bohemia, devoted mainly to offering medical care. Its members use the postnominal initials of O.M.C.R.S. Throughout its history it was accustomed to the use of arms, a custom which was confirmed in 1292 by an ambassador of Pope Nicholas IV. The grand master is still invested with a sword at his induction into office, and the congregation has been recognized as a military order by Popes Clement X and Innocent XII, as well as by several Holy Roman Emperors.

Origin
There is some discussion as to the real beginnings of this Order. Some authorities, among others the Bollandists, tracing it back to Palestine, where the first members were supposed to have borne arms against the Saracens. On the other hand, however, is the contemporary custom of establishing a religious community at the time of the foundation of a hospital, as well as the fact that in no document is there any trace of the Palestinian Crusaders having gone to Bohemia. Moreover, in a parchment Breviary of the Order, dated 1356, the account of foundation contains no allusion to such a lineage.

The Order, as a distinct entity, can trace its origin to 1233 in a fraternity of Franciscan tertiaries attached to a hospital at Prague under a community of Poor Clares, established by St. Agnes of Bohemia, making it the only male religious Order founded by a woman and the only Bohemian-founded Order. It was inspired by the nursing military Orders, such as the Knights Hospitaller.  In 1235 the hospital was richly endowed by the Queen of Bohemia, Agnes's mother, with property formerly belonging to the Teutonic Knights, a gift confirmed by Pope Gregory IX (18 May 1236), who stipulated that the revenues should be divided with the Poor Clare monastery.

After three years, during which the head of the Order had gone to Rome as the accredited representative of Agnes, now abbess of the monastery, and the Knights had been formally constituted as an Order under the Rule of St. Augustine by Pope Gregory in 1238, Agnes resigned all jurisdiction over the hospital and its possessions into the hands of the Holy See the next year. Twelve days later the pope formally assigned these to the recently confirmed Knights of the Cross with the Red Star, who were to hold them forever in fief to the Holy See, on condition of the yearly payment of a nominal sum.

Development
Another hospital was built for the Order at the Charles Bridge by Agnes, which was taken as the motherhouse, and to the title of the Order was added in latere (pede) pontis (Pragenis) ("at the foot of the Prague Bridge"). She also petitioned the Holy See for some mark to distinguish these knights from other military Orders, with whom they bore in common the red Crusader Cross. To this was added by Bishop Nicholas of Prague, on the authorization of the pope, a red six-pointed star (10 October 1250), probably from the arms of the first Master General, Albrecht von Sternberg.

The Order, which by 1253 had extensive possessions in Bohemia, soon spread to neighbouring lands. The Wrocław house in particular was the centre of many other foundations. It is Bohemia, in an especial manner, to which the knights have rendered incalculable services. Their success in hospital work is evidenced by the rapidity with which their houses multiplied, and the frequent testimony borne to it in documents of kings and emperors.

Within two decades after their foundation the care of souls had become as important as their hospital work, so quickly had the majority of lay brothers been replaced by priests. Numerous churches were entrusted to them in all parts of Bohemia, particularly in the western parts, where they formed a bulwark for Roman Catholic dogma against the spread of the teachings of Jan Hus in that region. In the Hussite Wars, the Taborites killed the pastor of St. Stephen's at Prague, and the Hussites destroyed the motherhouse. This brought the Order almost to the point of dissolution, but it recovered sufficiently to offer strenuous resistance to the advance of the teachings of the Protestant Reformation .

In the war with Sweden the members of the Order justified their claim to the title of knights during the siege of Cheb, fighting side by side with the townspeople, and sharing with them their last crust. Their hospital at Prague was also the first refuge of other Orders who came to work for souls in Bohemia, among them the Jesuits (1555) and Capuchins (1599).

For almost a hundred and fifty years the Archbishop of Prague held the post of Grand Master and were supported almost entirely by the revenues of the Order. Only on the restoration of the possessions of the archdiocese at the end of the 17th century was the Grand Master again elected from among the members, and a general reform instituted. George Ignatius Paspichal (1694–99), the first Grand Master under the new regime, showed great zeal for the restoration of the primitive ideals, especially that of charity. Even to the present day the Prague monastery supports twelve pensioners and distributes the so-called "hospital portion" to forty poor people.

Many knights have won enviable reputations in the world of learning, among others Mikuláš Kozař of Kozařov  (died 1592), a celebrated mathematician and astronomer; Jan František Beckovský (1658–1725), who established at Prague an herbarium which is still in existence.

In the 1910s, besides the motherhouse at Prague, there were about 26 incorporated parishes, and 85 professed members, several of whom are engaged in gymnasia and the University of Prague. There were benefices at Hradiště (now part of Znojmo), Vienna (where the Order has been established since the 13th century and still remains in possession of the Kreuzherren Palais), Cheb, Most and other towns, especially in western Bohemia. The Castle of Dobřichovice, near Prague, served as the summer residence of the Grand Master.

After the Czechoslovak coup d'état of 1948, the suppression of all Catholic religious orders (including the Knights) began. During the secret police-backed "Akce K" (Action K), all men's monasteries were closed, property was confiscated and members of the religious Orders were confined. They were tried in kangaroo courts, and, in 1950, 5 of 53 Knights were sentenced to multiple years in prison (36 years altogether). In 1990, after the Velvet Revolution, the Order's headquarters moved back into the monastery next to Prague's Charles Bridge.

Today the Order owns and manages property primarily in the Czech Republic. The most important properties, apart from the seat at Charles Bridge, include the Chlum of St. Mary in western Bohemia and the fortress of St. Hypolytus in Znojmo. After the communist takeover, the Order was returned approximately one billion euros worth of property.

The Order also manages the Karslkirche in Vienna.

References

Cross with the Red Star, Knights of the
Christianity in Prague
Military orders (monastic society)
1233 establishments in Europe
Religious organizations established in the 1230s
Christian religious orders established in the 13th century